is a former Japanese football player.

Playing career
Sakai was born in Sagamihara on August 9, 1977. After graduating from Tokyo University of Agriculture, he joined J2 League club Shonan Bellmare in 2000. He played many matches as forward in first season. However his opportunity to play decreased in 2001. In 2002, he moved to J2 club Montedio Yamagata and played many matches. In 2003, he moved to Regional Leagues club Okinawa Kariyushi FC. In October 2004, he moved to Japan Football League (JFL) club Thespa Kusatsu. The club was promoted to J2 from 2005 and he played many matches as offensive midfielder. In 2006, he moved to Regional Leagues club FC Machida Zelvia. He played as regular player for a long time and the club was promoted to JFL from 2009 and J2 from 2012. However he could hardly play in the match in 2012 and retired end of 2012 season.

Club statistics

References

External links

1977 births
Living people
Tokyo University of Agriculture alumni
Association football people from Kanagawa Prefecture
Japanese footballers
J2 League players
Japan Football League players
Shonan Bellmare players
Montedio Yamagata players
Thespakusatsu Gunma players
FC Machida Zelvia players
Association football midfielders